The Beatrice Six are Joseph White, Thomas Winslow, Ada JoAnn Taylor, Debra Shelden, James Dean and Kathy Gonzalez, who were falsely found guilty in 1989 of the 1985 rape and murder of Helen Wilson in Beatrice, Nebraska and served prison terms before being exonerated in 2009.

The conviction was won on five confessions which were obtained under threats that they would be given the death penalty if they did not. Additionally Dr. Reena Roy, the Nebraska State Patrol forensic scientist who performed blood and semen analysis, was never called to the stand to testify during the case, despite her analysis determining that none of the defendants on trial were a specific match to blood or semen found at the scene. In 2008, DNA evidence implicated Bruce Allen Smith, an original prime suspect in the murder who had died in 1992, and all of the Beatrice Six were exonerated the following year.

Most of the defendants were persuaded by the police psychologist, Wayne Price, that they had repressed memories of the crime. White, who maintained his innocence, demanded the examination of DNA evidence that led to their exoneration and then filed a Federal civil rights lawsuit against Gage County, Nebraska on behalf of all six defendants, which went to trial in January 2014; White had by then died in a workplace accident in 2011. In July 2016, a jury awarded them $28 million, The county's appeal reached the Supreme Court of the United States, which declined to hear the case on March 4, 2019. Gage County had to raise property taxes to the maximum amount permitted under the law in order to pay the jury award. It is expected that the county will make payments twice a year after property taxes are collected. The Beatrice Six, including the heirs of White, received their first payment in June 2019.

An HBO Original six-part documentary series about the Beatrice Six, the murder, investigation, trial, exoneration, civil suits and aftermath titled Mind Over Murder was released in 2022, with the first episode airing on Monday, June 20.

See also
 List of wrongful convictions in the United States
 Nebraska Innocence Project

References

External links
 Kathy Gonzalez innocenceproject.org
 Thomas Winslow innocenceproject.org
 Joseph White innocenceproject.org
 Ada JoAnn Taylor innocenceproject.org
 James Dean innocenceproject.org
 Debra Shelden innocenceproject.org

Overturned convictions in the United States
American people wrongfully convicted of murder
People from Beatrice, Nebraska
Legal history of Nebraska
Quantified groups of defendants